General elections were held in Democratic Republic of the Congo on 28 November 2011; a facultative run-off on 26 February 2012 was shelved with a change in election laws.

The government passed laws to abolish the second round of the presidential election and tried to change the legislative electoral system from proportional to majority representation, which was strongly criticized by the opposition.

International organizations such as the United Nations and the European Union raised concerns about the transparency of the elections.

On 8 November 2011 opposition leader Étienne Tshisekedi declared himself president saying the majority of people turned against President Kabila.

On 28 November 2011 elections were held under difficult conditions.  Voting was characterized by incidents of violence throughout the country. Because of violence and delays in the delivery of ballot boxes elections were extended by a second day.

Candidates
Jean Andeka (ANCC)
Adam Bombolé (independent)
Joseph Kabila (independent)
François Nicéphore Kakese (URDC)
Vital Kamerhe (UNC)
Oscar Kashala (UREC)
Léon Kengo (UFC)
Antipas Mbusa (independent)
Nzanga Mobutu (Udemo)
Josué Alex Mukendi (independent)
Étienne Tshisekedi (UDPS)

Registration
DR Congo's National Independent Electoral Commission has registered 32 million voters for the November elections.

Results

President
The first results released on 2 December 2011, with 15% of the vote counted (mostly in areas considered Kabila strongholds), gave Kabila only a narrow lead of 940,000 votes against 912,000 votes for UPDS leader Tshisekedi.

With half the precincts counted, Kabila was leading with 4.9 million votes, or nearly 49%. His opponent Etienne Tshisekedi was trailing with 3.4 million votes, about 34%. However, this count did not include much of Kinshasa, where Tshisekedi was expected to have strong results. Kabila ceased all email and SMS services nationwide. It has been also said that over 5,000,000 of ballot papers were pre-ticked for the number 3 candidate (Kabila), but no formal actions were taken by the CENI. Some witnesses said that young men had beaten election officials who tried to bring in fraudulent ballots, which were subsequently burned.

The announcement of final results was postponed to 8 December 2011; with over two thirds of the vote counted, Kabila led with 46% to Tshisekedi's 36%.

The Independent National Electoral Commission declared Kabila as the winner on December 9. The result was put into question by the Carter Center as well as the archbishop of Kinshasa, Cardinal Laurent Monsengwo Pasinya, claiming too many irregularities occurred to assure that the results reflected the will of the people. The Carter Center indicated that ballots had been missing in some areas while in others Kabila achieved unrealistic results. Observers from the Carter Center noted that in some districts voter turnout was reported to be 100 percent, which is extremely unlikely.  MONUSCO, the peacekeeping mission of the United Nations, also voiced concern about the results.

While Kabila admitted that some mistakes had been made in the process, he rejected concerns about the outcome. The result was confirmed by the Supreme Court of the Democratic Republic of Congo.

Jerome Kitoko, President of the Supreme Court, announcing the official results proclaimed Kabila to be the winner of the Presidential election.

National Assembly

Aftermath
The rebels in the 2012 East D.R. Congo conflict said Kabila was not the legal winner of the election and must resign.

References

Elections in the Democratic Republic of the Congo
General election
DR Congo
Presidential elections in the Democratic Republic of the Congo
Election and referendum articles with incomplete results